Roger Tobler (born 23 June 1973) is a South African rower. He competed at the 1996 Summer Olympics and the 2000 Summer Olympics.

References

External links
 

1973 births
Living people
South African male rowers
Olympic rowers of South Africa
Rowers at the 1996 Summer Olympics
Rowers at the 2000 Summer Olympics
Rowers from Johannesburg
21st-century South African people